The 2008 Oregon Republican presidential primary was a mail only primary in the U.S. state of Oregon. Ballots were mailed to registered Republican voters between May 2 and May 6, 2008. To be counted, all ballots must have been received by county elections offices by 8:00 p.m. PDT on May 20, 2008. It was a closed primary; in order to vote in Republican races, residents must have registered as Republicans on or before April 29, 2008.

Presidential race

In the race for the Republican nominee for President of the United States, there were two candidates on the Oregon ballot: John McCain and Ron Paul.

Results

Other races

U.S. Senate

Incumbent Senator Gordon Smith defeated Gordon Leitch for the Republican nomination as he sought re-election to the United States Senate.

U.S. House of Representatives

Oregon Republicans selected their candidate in four of Oregon's five congressional districts for the United States House of Representatives.

Haugen is now the Independent Party of Oregon candidate, Another Republican Stephan Andrew Brodhead an Iraq War veteran and Real Estate investor Of Hillsboro, Oregon is running an active campaign as a write-in candidate.

Statewide offices

This election determined the Republican candidate for two statewide offices. For Secretary of State, Rick Dancer was unopposed.; for Treasurer Allen Alley was also unopposed. No Republican filed to run for Attorney General, but there were 13,043 write-in votes. John Kroger, who also won the Democratic primary, got 2,885 votes and will be the Republican nominee as well. Kroger's Democratic rival Greg Macpherson came in second with 1,391 votes.

Oregon Senate

Half (15) the positions in the Oregon State Senate were up for election. Republicans nominated candidates in 11 Senate districts for the general election, including one successful write-in candidate.

Oregon House of Representatives

As is the case every two years, all the 60 positions in the Oregon House of Representatives were up for election. Republicans nominated candidates in 44 House districts for the general election, including two successful write-in candidates.

See also
 2008 Oregon Democratic presidential primary
 2008 Republican Party presidential primaries

References

Oregon
Republican
Oregon Republican primaries